Sergey Lapin (born December 17, 1988) is a Ukrainian professional boxer. Master of Sport of Ukraine, International Class.

Career
Sergey Lapin was born on 17 December 1988, in Dzerzhinsk, a city in Nizhny Novgorod Oblast. His father, Sergey Yurevich Lapin, is an Honoured Coach of Ukraine.

In Simferopol, Sergey Lapin started boxing under the guidance of his father. He was training together with Oleksandr Usyk, the future Olympic Champion.

Sergey became a bronze medalist of Ukrainian championship in 2009, 2010 and 2012. In the 2013 championship, he became a winner in the light-heavyweight class.

Sergey Lapin is now a Chief Officer of promotional company Usyk 17 Promotions, founded by Oleksandr Usyk.

Honours 
 Champion of Ukraine: 2013
 Bronze medalist of the Ukrainian Championship: 2009, 2010, 2012
 Ukrainian Cup Winner: 2012
 Tournament winner Pedro Saez Benedicto: 2008, 2009, 2010, 2011, 2013, 2014, 2017
 Felix Stam Tournament Winner: 2012
 Winner of the tournament of the strongest boxers of Ukraine: 2012
 WSB World Championship Finalist: 2013

Professional boxing record

References

External links

1988 births
Living people
Ukrainian male boxers
People from Dzerzhinsk, Russia